Michael York OBE (born Michael Hugh Johnson; 27 March 1942) is a British film, television and stage actor. After performing on-stage with the Royal National Theatre, he had a breakthrough in films by playing Tybalt in Franco Zeffirelli's Romeo and Juliet (1968). His blond, blue-eyed boyish looks and English upper social class demeanor saw him play leading roles in several major British and Hollywood films of the 1970s. His best known roles include Konrad Ludwig in Something for Everyone (1970), Geoffrey Richter-Douglas in Zeppelin (1971), Brian Roberts in Cabaret (1972), George Conway in Lost Horizon (1973), D'Artagnan in The Three Musketeers (also 1973) and its two sequels, Count Andrenyi in Murder on the Orient Express (1974), Logan 5 in Logan's Run (1976).

In his later career he found success as Basil Exposition in the Austin Powers film series (1997–2002). He is a two-time Emmy Award nominee, for the ABC Afterschool Special: Are You My Mother? (1986) and the AMC series The Lot (2001).

In 2002, he received a Star on the Hollywood Walk of Fame for his contributions to motion pictures.

Early life
York was born in Fulmer, Gerrards Cross, Buckinghamshire, son of Florence Edith May Chown, a musician, and Joseph Gwynne Johnson, a Llandovery-born Welsh ex-Royal Artillery British Army officer   and businessman. York has an elder sister, Penelope Anne (born 1940) and younger twin sisters, Caroline and Bridget (born 1947); Bridget died a few hours after birth, according to York's autobiography. He was brought up in Burgess Hill, Sussex.

During his teenage years, York was educated at Bromley Grammar School for Boys, Hurstpierpoint College and University College, Oxford. He did some early acting at the community theatre Bromley Little Theatre and is now its president. This then led to his joining the National Youth Theatre, also performing with the Oxford University Dramatic Society and the University College Players. He began his career in a 1956 production of The Yellow Jacket. In 1959, he made his West End début with a small part in a production of Hamlet.

Career
Prior to graduating with a degree in English from the University of Oxford in 1964, York had toured with the National Youth Theatre, After some time with the Dundee Repertory Theatre, where he played in Brendan Behan's The Hostage, York joined National Theatre under Laurence Olivier where he worked with Franco Zeffirelli during the 1965 staging of Much Ado About Nothing. Following his role on British TV as Jolyon (Jolly) in The Forsyte Saga (1967), York made his film debut as Lucentio in Zeffirelli's  The Taming of the Shrew (1967). He then was cast as Tybalt in Zeffirelli's 1968 film adaptation of Romeo and Juliet. He starred in The Guru (1969), then played an amoral bisexual drifter in Something for Everyone (1970). In the 1971 film Zeppelin, he portrayed a World War I soldier with conflicted family loyalties who pretends to side with the Germans. He portrayed the bisexual Brian Roberts in Bob Fosse's film version of Cabaret (1972). In 1975, he portrayed a British soldier in 19th century colonial India in Conduct Unbecoming, the first of three movies he did with director Michael Anderson. In 1977, he reunited with Franco Zeffirelli as John the Baptist in Jesus of Nazareth.

York starred as D'Artagnan in the 1973 adaptation of The Three Musketeers and he made his Broadway début in the original production of Tennessee Williams's Out Cry. One year later the sequel to The Three Musketeers was released (roughly covering events in the second half of the book) titled The Four Musketeers. Fifteen years later, most of the cast (and crew) joined together in a third film titled The Return of the Musketeers based on the Dumas novel Twenty Years After. He played the title character in the film adaptation of Logan's Run (1976), a fugitive who tries to escape a computer-controlled society. The following year, he starred in The Island of Dr. Moreau opposite Burt Lancaster.

Since his auspicious early work, York has enjoyed a busy and varied career in film, television and on the stage. He appeared in two episodes in the second season of the Road to Avonlea series as Ezekiel Crane, the lighthouse keeper of Avonlea and foster father of Gus Pike. His Broadway theatre credits include Bent (1980), The Crucible (1992), Someone Who'll Watch Over Me (1993) and the ill-fated musical The Little Prince and the Aviator (1982), which closed during previews. He also has made many sound recordings as a reader, including Harper Audio's production of C. S. Lewis' The Lion, the Witch and the Wardrobe.

York appeared in the 1996 Babylon 5 episode "A Late Delivery from Avalon" as a delusional man who believed himself to be King Arthur returned.  Two years later he would play King Arthur in A Knight in Camelot. He also appeared as Professor Asher Fleming, a 60-year-old Yale professor and boyfriend of Yale student Paris Geller (Liza Weil) during the fourth season of Gilmore Girls. He performed the voice of the character Dr. Montague Kane in the Batman: The Animated Series episode "Zatanna", as well as Kanto in the Superman: The Animated Series episode "Tools of the Trade" and Ares in the Justice League Unlimited episode "Hawk & Dove". York starred in both The Omega Code and its sequel, Megiddo: The Omega Code 2, as Stone Alexander, the Antichrist from Christian eschatology.

In 2002, he received a Star on the Hollywood Walk of Fame for his contributions to motion pictures. He played President Alexander Bourne of Macaronesia on seaQuest 2032. He played Basil Exposition in all three of the Austin Powers films. He has made an appearance on The Simpsons as Mason Fairbanks, Homer Simpson's possible father, in "Homer's Paternity Coot". In 2006, York played the character Bernard Fremont (inspired by real life serial killer Charles Sobhraj) in the Law & Order: Criminal Intent episode "Slither". He also appeared as a fictionalised version of himself in several episodes of the third season of Curb Your Enthusiasm as an investor in Larry's new restaurant 'BoBo's. In 2009, he lent his voice to Star Wars: The Clone Wars.

York voiced Petrie's uncle Pterano in The Land Before Time VII: The Stone of Cold Fire. In 2009, he narrated the entire Bible for The Word of Promise Audio Bible, a star-studded, performance of the New King James Version. York again played King Arthur in a revival of Lerner and Loewe's Camelot, which began its run at the La Mirada Theatre in Southern California, and toured nationally in 2006 and 2007.

York portrays Luke in The Truth & Life Dramatised Audio New Testament Bible, a 22-hour audio dramatisation of the New Testament, which uses the Revised Standard Version Catholic Edition translation. In 2008, York took part in the BBC Wales programme Coming Home about his Welsh family history. In September 2013, York played Albany in the Gala Performance of William Shakespeare's King Lear at the Old Vic in London.<ref>[http://bookings.oldvictheatre.com/single/PSDetail.aspx?psn=16151 "King Lear]. . The Old Vic. Accessed 4 November 2014.</ref>

Personal life
York met photographer Patricia McCallum in 1967 when she was assigned to photograph him, and they married on 27 March 1968, York's 26th birthday. His stepson is Star Wars producer Rick McCallum. York was named to the International Best Dressed List Hall of Fame in 1977.

Health issues
York announced he was suffering from the rare disease called amyloidosis in 2013. Doctors initially thought he had bone cancer. He underwent a stem cell transplant, which can alleviate symptoms, in 2012.

York and his wife moved to Rochester, Minnesota, in 2022 to be closer to the Mayo Clinic Hospital for treatment.

Filmography

Film

Television

Video games

Autobiography
 .
 .
Also available in other editions

Other works
 York wrote about his experience with Megiddo: The Omega Code 2 in Dispatches from Armageddon. 2001, Smith & Kraus. .
 York is also the co-author, with director Adrian Brine, of A Shakespearean Actor Prepares''. 2000, Smith & Kraus. .

Awards and nominations

References

External links

 
 
 
 

1942 births
Living people
Alumni of University College, Oxford
Audiobook narrators
British male film actors
English expatriates in the United States
English male film actors
English male stage actors
English male television actors
English male video game actors
English male voice actors
English people of Welsh descent
National Youth Theatre members
Officers of the Order of the British Empire
People educated at Hurstpierpoint College
People from Gerrards Cross
20th-century English male actors
21st-century English male actors